Chaungtha is a town and beach resort located in Shwethaungyan Subtownship, Pathein Township, Ayeyarwady Region, Myanmar. Chaungtha Beach, as it is more commonly known, is about 5 hours' drive away from Yangon, and is a popular resort with Yangonites from October to April. As it is relatively more affordable than the nearby Ngwesaung and Ngapali beaches, Chaungtha is also more crowded and less clean than the two more expensive and better maintained beaches.

Chaungtha has three urban wards with a total population of 3,077 people in 2014. The surrounding village tract had a population of 27,941 people.

Etymology
Chaungtha received its name from the small stream (chaung) which flowed at the western part of the village. In the Burmese language, Chaungtha means Pleasant Stream.

Attractions
Chaungtha is renowned for its fresh and reasonably priced seafood. A major attraction is a small pagoda built on a limestone boulder at the southern end of the beach. The main beach is more scrappy and down-to-earth. Nearby fishing villages and tidal mangrove forests are also popular among the tourists. 

Chaungtha has several offshore islands, available for snorkelling and is accessible from nearby Ngwesaung beach along a coastal motorbike trail.

See also
Ngwesaung Beach
Thandwe
Pathein

References

Populated places in Ayeyarwady Region
Tourist attractions in Myanmar
Beaches of Myanmar